Phillip, Brisbane and Bligh was an electoral district of the Legislative Assembly in the Australian state of New South Wales from 1856 to 1859. It included Phillip, Brisbane and Bligh counties, including Scone, Murrurundi, Dunedoo and Mudgee. It was replaced by Upper Hunter and Mudgee.

Members for Phillip, Brisbane and Bligh

Election results

1856

1858

References

Phillip, Brisbane and Bligh
1856 establishments in Australia
1859 disestablishments in Australia